Carl Davis (born March 2, 1992) is an American football defensive tackle for the New England Patriots of the National Football League (NFL). He played college football at Iowa.

Early years
Davis attended Adlai Stevenson High School, where he played high school football. He was named first-team All-state by the Detroit Free Press, The Detroit News and The Macomb Daily. He was a first-team All-conference as a senior after earning second-team honors as a junior. As a junior, he collected 47 tackles, with eight tackles for loss, 15 QB hurries and three QB sacks, helping prep team post 10-2 mark. He recorded 58 tackles as a senior, including six QB sacks while leading his team to a 13-1 record and advancing to the state championship game at Ford Field. Also blocked two field goals, had one interception and scored one touchdown. Davis also lettered in basketball and track and field.

College career
Davis was redshirted as a true freshman at the University of Iowa in 2010. As a redshirt freshman in 2011, Davis played in six games and had two tackles. As a sophomore in 2012, he played in 11 games making eight tackles. Davis became a first year starter as a junior in 2013, starting all 13 games. He finished the season with 42 tackles and 1.5 sacks. Davis entered his senior season in 2014 as a starter for the second consecutive year.

Professional career
On November 10, 2014, it was reported that Davis had accepted an invitation to play in the 2015 Senior Bowl as a part of the North team under Tennessee Titans' head coach Ken Whisenhunt. Davis improved his draft stock with top performances during practice throughout the week and met with coaches from the Baltimore Ravens. He was dominant and showed his strength while beating Pitt's offensive tackle T. J. Clemmings. For his efforts, Davis was voted by a panel of NFL scouts as the Reese's Senior Bowl Practice Player of the Week. On January 24, 2015, Davis assisted on a tackle for a loss and sacked Colorado State's Garrett Grayson, as he helped the North defeat the South 34-13. He attended the NFL combine as a top defensive end prospect and completed nearly all of the required combine drills, but opted to skip the bench press. Davis had pre-draft visits and private workouts with six teams, including the Dallas Cowboys, San Francisco 49ers, Buffalo Bills, Miami Dolphins, Detroit Lions, and Chicago Bears. On March 23, 2015, Davis participated at Iowa's pro day, along with Brandon Scherff, Andrew Donnal, Louis Trinca-Pasat, John Lowdermilk, Damond Powell, Mark Weisman, and six others. At the conclusion of the pre-draft process, Davis was projected to be a second round pick by NFL draft experts and scouts. He was ranked the fifth best defensive tackle prospect by Sports Illustrated, the sixth best defensive tackle by NFLDraftScout.com and NFL analyst Mike Mayock, and was ranked the eighth best defensive tackle by NFL analyst Charles Davis.

Baltimore Ravens

2015

The Baltimore Ravens selected Davis in the third round (90th overall) of the 2015 NFL Draft, after unexpectedly falling in the draft. He was the fifth defensive tackle selected, behind Danny Shelton (No. 12, Browns), Malcom Brown (No. 32, Patriots), Eddie Goldman (No. 39, Bears), and Jordan Phillips (No. 52,  Dolphins). The Baltimore Ravens were originally targeting Florida State's P. J. Williams (No. 78, Saints), Virginia's Eli Harold (No. 79, 49ers), and UNI's David Johnson (No. 86, Cardinals) with their third round selection, but chose Davis as he was the best talent available. Although the Baltimore Ravens did not have a pre-draft visit or private workout with Davis, they did meet with him during the Senior Bowl and NFL Scouting Combine in Indianapolis. On May 8, 2015, the Baltimore Ravens signed Davis to a four-year, $2.95 million contract that includes a signing bonus of $625,084.

He competed with Brandon Williams and Christo Bilukidi throughout training camp for the vacant starting nose tackle position left by the departure of Haloti Ngata to the Detroit Lions during free agency. Head coach John Harbaugh named Davis the backup starting nose tackle to Williams to begin the regular season.

He made his professional regular season debut in the Baltimore Ravens' season-opener against the Denver Broncos and recorded three combined tackles and a pass deflection in their 19-13 loss. On September 27, 2015, Davis earned his first career start at defensive tackle and defended a pass during their 28-24 loss to the Cincinnati Bengals. He started the next two games at defensive tackle, in place of Timmy Jernigan who had an injured knee. Davis was a healthy scratch for Weeks 12-14 despite having a strong start to his rookie season and being the first member of the Ravens' 2015 draft class to start.

In 13 games of his rookie season, Davis produced 11 tackles and 2 passes defended.

2016
Davis competed with Brandon Williams, Willie Henry, Michael Pierce, and Trevon Coley throughout training camp for the starting nose tackle position. On September 1, 2016, Davis sustained an ankle injury and left during the Baltimore Ravens' 23-14 victory over the New Orleans Saints in their pre-season finale. On September 5, 2016, Davis was placed on injured reserve and missed the entire  season with an ankle injury.

2017
He was named the backup defensive end, behind Brent Urban and Brandon Williams to start the regular season.

On October 1, 2017, David earned his first start of the season after Brent Urban was placed on injured reserve. He recorded three solo tackles in the Ravens' 26-9 loss to the Pittsburgh Steelers. The next game, he suffered a hamstring injury during the first half of a 30-17 victory over the Oakland Raiders. He missed the following game and played sparingly in the next 7 weeks due to the injury.

2018
On September 1, 2018, Davis was waived by the Ravens.

Cleveland Browns
On September 2, 2018, Davis was claimed off waivers by the Cleveland Browns. He played minimally for the Browns, registering just one assisted tackle for 2018.

The Browns re-signed Davis on a one year $2 million contract on March 12, 2019. The Browns released Davis on August 31, 2019.

Indianapolis Colts
On October 14, 2019, Davis was signed by the Indianapolis Colts. He was released on November 4.

Jacksonville Jaguars
On November 25, 2019, Davis was signed by the Jacksonville Jaguars.

On February 4, 2020, Davis was suspended the first four games of the 2020 season for violating the league’s performance-enhancing substance policy. He was re-signed by the Jaguars on April 6, 2020. He was released on May 12, 2020, but re-signed on August 10. He was reinstated from suspension on October 5, 2020, and the team was given a roster exemption for him. He was released on October 12 and signed to the team's practice squad the next day.

New England Patriots
On October 14, 2020, Davis was signed by the New England Patriots off the Jaguars practice squad. He was placed on injured reserve on November 28, 2020, with a concussion. He was designated to return from injured reserve on December 17, and began practicing with the team again, but was not activated before the end of the regular season.

Davis signed a contract extension with the Patriots on March 15, 2021, and on April 27, 2022, Davis re-signed with the Patriots.

Personal life
Davis' mother, Ovella Davis, is a pastor in the Detroit, Michigan area and is very active in her community.

During the 2016 season, Davis founded the Trenchwork Foundation that's based in his hometown of Detroit. Trenchwork Foundation's mission is to maintain community development and help children stay committed to healthy living and education. They also provide children book bags and new equipment for the local youth football team.

References

External links
Iowa Hawkeyes bio

1992 births
Living people
Players of American football from Detroit
American football defensive tackles
Iowa Hawkeyes football players
Baltimore Ravens players
Cleveland Browns players
Indianapolis Colts players
Jacksonville Jaguars players
New England Patriots players